Golovari is a rural locality (a village) in Posyolok Mezinovsky, Gus-Khrustalny District, Vladimir Oblast, Russia. The population was 17 as of 2010.

Geography 
Golovari is located 19 km southwest of Gus-Khrustalny (the district's administrative centre) by road. Nechayevskaya is the nearest rural locality.

References 

Rural localities in Gus-Khrustalny District